Kanalukku Karaiyethu is a 1982 Indian Tamil-language film, starring Shankar and Mucherla Aruna .

Cast

Shankar
Mucherla Aruna

Soundtrack

Reception

References

1980 films
1982 films
1980s Tamil-language films
Films scored by Shankar–Ganesh